Damasippoididae is a family of walkingsticks in the order Phasmatodea. There are at least two genera and about six described species in Damasippoididae, found in Madagascar.

Genera
These two genera belong to the family Damasippoididae:
 Damasippoides Brancsik, 1893
 Pseudoleosthenes Redtenbacher, 1906

References

Further reading

 
 
 

Phasmatodea
Phasmatodea families